Costitx is a small municipality on Majorca, one of the Balearic Islands, Spain.

The Observatorio Astronómico de Mallorca is situated just south of Costitx.

References

Municipalities in Mallorca
Populated places in Mallorca